The Kerepehi Fault (also known as the Kerepēhi Fault) is a NeS-to NWeSE-striking normal fault system in the North Island of New Zealand aligned with the Hauraki rift valley that produced the Firth of Thames and the Hauraki Plains. The Kerepehi Fault has a maximum potential of generating earthquakes with magnitudes of 7.2 or above.

Geology
The Kerepehi Fault in the southern portion of the Hauraki Rift is much more complex than previously thought and as a result has the potential for large earthquakes, although single fault segment events should be less than 7.0 in magnitude. Previously it was thought to contain 5 fault segments with events separated by many thousands of years of moderate magnitude but the mean event separation anywhere in the fault zone is now known to be only about 1000 years in what is a belt of many faults and at least 6 complex segments on land. Three segments have been identified under the sea. The fault system extends therefore from Waiheke Island to south of Te Poi and is the intra-rift fault structure for the now geologically fairly inactive by New Zealand standards, Hauraki Rift. The recently identified but yet to be fully characterised 25km long Te Puninga fault is presumably a parallel intra-rift fault much closer to the western borders of the Hauraki Rift.

Hazards

Earthquake
Forty percent of New Zealand’s population live, and 40% of GDP generation occurs within  of the fault. A major magnitude 8 to 10 event resulting from up to 3 segment rupture would be devastating to Hauraki Plains infrastructure.

Tsunami
At least a third of the fault structure is likely to be underwater and thus will offer a tsunami hazard to the low lying areas of the Hauraki Plains and shore areas of the Firth of Thames and Hauraki Gulf. The tsunami hazard was calculated to be low in 1999 but has not been revised as a result of the later on shore work showing that some earthquakes were larger than historically assumed.

References

Seismic faults of New Zealand
Thames-Coromandel District
Firth of Thames
Hauraki District